Richard L. Byerly (July 18, 1938 – May 23, 2020) was an American politician and educator.

Background
Byerly was born in Boone, Iowa and graduated from Boone High School in 1955. He graduated from Boone Junior College in 1958. He graduated from Simpson College in 1960. Byerly received his master's and doctorate degrees from Iowa State University from 1967 to 1970. Byerly worked in administration with the Des Moines Area Community College. He served in the Iowa House of Representatives from 1973 to 1983 and was a Democrat.

References

1938 births
2020 deaths
People from Boone, Iowa
Iowa State University alumni
Simpson College alumni
Educators from Iowa
Democratic Party members of the Iowa House of Representatives